Paddock Wood is a town and civil parish in the borough of Tunbridge Wells in Kent, England, about  southwest of Maidstone. At the 2001 Census it had a population of 8,263, falling marginally to 8,253 at the 2011 Census. Paddock Wood is a centre for hop growing.

History
Paddock Wood developed as a settlement during the second half of the 19th century as a result of the local hops industry. By 1900 it was a local transport hub with three railway lines at the railway station.

Government
Paddock Wood has three tiers of local government: parish, borough and county.

Borough council
Since 1974 Paddock Wood has formed part of the Borough of Tunbridge Wells. The borough is governed by a 48-member council. The town elects 4 borough councillors, with 2 each for the Paddock Wood East and Paddock Wood West wards. As of July 2022, one is a member of the Labour Party, one is a member of local action group Tunbridge Wells Alliance, and two are Independent.

County council
The upper tier of local government is provided by Kent County Council. The county council has 84 members, with each representing an electoral district. Paddock Wood forms part of the electoral district of Tunbridge Wells Rural.

Geography
The commercial areas of Paddock Wood are separated by the railway line.

To the South of the railway lies Commercial Road which runs north east to south west through the town, and is the main shopping street. At the north east end of the street is the entrance to the Railway Station. Commercial Road is home to the branches of several banks, a variety of take-aways, a restaurant and a number of small shops. To the east of Commercial Road, runs Maidstone Road. This road runs north to Beltring and East Peckham, and south to Matfield, and is the main route into and out of the town.

To the north of the railway line lie the industrial areas. Eldon Way Industrial Estate can be found to the east and is home to British Car Auctions, among others. To the west is the larger Transfesa Road and Paddock Wood Distribution Centre. This is the home to a number of companies including Gabriel Chemie UK Ltd, Norman Collett, CoolChain, Mack Multiples, Warburtons and a Whirlpool warehouse, which was destroyed in a large fire in early July 2005.

Culture and community

Mascalls Gallery, was a public art gallery opened in 2006. It closed in 2016, due to a lack of funds.

Although technically in Beltring, in the civil parish of East Peckham, the nearby Hop Farm hosts many events such as the circus, monster truck racing and music festivals.

St Andrew's Church is a joint Anglican and Methodist church located on Maidstone Road.

Transport
Paddock Wood is on the B2160 and B2161 roads and not too far from the A228, A264, A21 and A26 roads. The A21 in the area suffers from congestion and traffic problems. It is served by Paddock Wood railway station.

Education

The town's main primary school is Paddock Wood Primary School which was originally built in 1909, which has approximately 600 pupils.

The town's main secondary school is Mascalls Academy (formerly Mascalls School), a comprehensive secondary school which opened in 1956, which has approximately 1400 pupils.

Literary references

Some Dickens scholars believe that Paddock Wood is the rural railway station described in Dombey and Son. Some believe that one of Charles Dickens's children was buried in the graveyard as it says on the sign at the entrance.

Paddock Wood Railway station appears in the novel Dombey and Son by Charles Dickens where, in chapter 55, the character of Mr Carker accidentally falls under a train at the station and is killed.

Notable people

Philip Martin Brown (b 1956), actor, lives in Paddock Wood.
John Brunt VC (1922–1944), British Army officer, lived in Paddock Wood.
Frederick E. Morgan (1894–1967), British Army officer, born in Paddock Wood.
Sammy Rimington (b 1942), jazz musician, born in Paddock Wood.

References

External links
Official Town Guide

 
Towns in Kent
Civil parishes in Kent